Bunn and Co. was a radio programme that aired from March 2003 to April 2004.  There were 11 half-hour episodes and it was broadcast on BBC Radio 4.  It starred Keith Barron.

References 
 Lavalie, John. Bunn and Co. EpGuides. 21 Jul 2005. 29 Jul 2005 <https://web.archive.org/web/20070913181538/http://www.epguides.com/BunnandCo/%3E.

BBC Radio 4 programmes
2003 radio programme debuts